The New Record by My Bloody Valentine is the second EP by the Irish-English alternative rock band My Bloody Valentine, released in September 1986 on Kaleidoscope Sound. Recorded at Alaska Studios in London, the EP's sound is influenced by C86, a brand of indie pop, and diverges from the band's earlier post-punk sound.

Allmusic writer Nitsuh Abebe has called The New Record by My Bloody Valentine "a vital point in the development of [the band's] sound" and referred to it as "the point at which the band started to experiment with pop music and noise", influenced by The Jesus and Mary Chain. Upon its release, The New Record by My Bloody Valentine peaked at number 22 in the UK Independent Singles Chart.

Track listing

Personnel
All personnel credits adapted from The New Record by My Bloody Valentines liner notes.

My Bloody Valentine
David Conway – vocals
Kevin Shields – guitar, vocals
Debbie Googe – bass
Colm Ó Cíosóig – drums

Technical personnel
My Bloody Valentine – production
Joe Foster – production
Steve Nunn – engineering
Pete Peterson – photography

Chart positions

References

Bibliography

External links

1986 EPs
My Bloody Valentine (band) EPs
Albums produced by Slaughter Joe